Ömnödelger (Front wide) is a sum (district) of Khentii Province in north-eastern Mongolia. The former location of the sum's center is at  47 53 N 109 55 E. The town of Gurvanbayan is 52 km northeast of the sum center's current location. In 2010, its population was 5,156.

References 

Populated places in Mongolia
Districts of Khentii Province